= Paperville Creek =

Stream in Tennessee, U.S.

Coordinates: 36.5509416°N 82.1276298°W

Paperville Creek is a stream in the U.S. state of Tennessee.

Paperville Creek took its name from a paper mill near its course. A settlement called Paperville also once existed in the area.
